Isabelle de Hertogh (born 1972) is a Belgian actress.

Debut
She was a student at the Royal Conservatory of Brussels from 1997 to 1998.

Filmography

Theater

References

External links

Living people
1972 births
Belgian film actresses
21st-century Belgian actresses
Place of birth missing (living people)